Marcela Serrano (born 1951) is a Chilean novelist. In 1994, her first novel, Para que no me olvides, won the Literary Prize in Santiago, and her second book, Nosotras que nos queremos tanto, won the Sor Juana Inés de la Cruz Prize for women writers in Spanish. She received the runner-up award in the renowned Premio Planeta competition in 2001 for her novel Lo que está en mi corazón. Carlos Fuentes has quoted her description of the modern woman as "having the capacity to change skin like a snake, freeing herself from the inevitability and servitude of more obsolete times."

Biography
Marcela Serrano is the daughter of novelist Elisa Serrana and engineer and essayist .

She is considered a "late editor" -- "I began to write at age 38 and recently at age 40, I published my first novel" -- even though as a girl she wrote "dozens of books", she threw them all out. That first novel appeared in 1991: We who love ourselves very much, which was an immediate success the next year and later received two prizes. She has published a series of works, one of them was from the "género negro" and other children's books, which is ultimately joined together with Margarita Maira, one of her daughters.

Literary awards
 Sor Juana Inés de la Cruz Prize, 1994, Nosotras que nos queremos tanto
 Santiago Municipal Literature Award, 1994, Para que no me olvides
 Premio Planeta, finalist, 2001, Lo que está en mi corazón

Books
 Nosotras que nos queremos tanto, 1991 - Suma de Letras (paperback 2002),  
 Para que no me olvides, 1993 
 Antigua Vida Mia, 1995 - tr. Margaret Sayers Peden, Antigua and My Life Before: A Novel, Anchor (2001), . Filmed by Hector Olivera in 2001. 
 Lo que está en mi corazón, - Booket (paperback 2003), 
 El albergue de las mujeres tristes, 1997 - Paperback - Oct 2, 2004
 Nuestra Señora de la Soledad, 1999
 Un mundo raro: Dos relatos mexicanos, 2000.
 Lo que está en mi corazón, 2001
 El cristal del miedo, with Margarita Maira, 2002,
 Hasta siempre, mujercitas, 2004
 La llorona, 2008
 Diez mujeres, 2011
 Dulce enemiga mía, 2013 (collection of short stories)
 La Novena, novela, 2016

References

1951 births
Living people
20th-century Chilean novelists
Chilean women novelists
20th-century Chilean women writers
21st-century Chilean novelists
21st-century Chilean women writers
21st-century Chilean short story writers
Chilean women short story writers